KFSA (950 AM) is a radio station broadcasting a country music format. Licensed to Fort Smith, Arkansas, United States, it serves the Fort Smith area. The station is owned by Fred H. Baker, Jr., through licensee Star 92, Co.

950 AM is a Regional broadcast frequency.

On January 11, 2021, KFSA changed its format from country to conservative talk.

On April 16, 2022, KFSA changed its format back to country branded as "Outlaw 93.1".

Previous logos

References

External links

FSA
Radio stations established in 1947
1947 establishments in Arkansas